The Gunfighters is the eighth serial of the third season in the British science fiction television series Doctor Who, which was first broadcast in four weekly parts from 30 April to 21 May 1966.

The serial is set in and around the town of Tombstone, Arizona, in the Wild West. In the serial, the time traveller the First Doctor (William Hartnell) and his travelling companions Steven Taylor (Peter Purves) and Dodo Chaplet (Jackie Lane) get themselves involved with the events leading up to the Gunfight at the O.K. Corral.

Plot

In the frontier town of Tombstone, Arizona, the troublesome Clanton brothers, Ike, Phineas and Billy, are in search of Doc Holliday to settle an old score over the death of another brother called Reuben. They meet up with their hired hand Seth Harper at the Last Chance Saloon. He knows what Holliday looks like and describes his coat and demeanour. This is overheard by bar singer Kate, who lets her paramour Holliday know he is in danger.

The TARDIS has arrived in a nearby stable, with the First Doctor in agony from toothache. He and his companions Steven and Dodo, dressed as cowboys, encounter local marshal Wyatt Earp, who offers them his protection and warns them to keep his counsel. The Doctor finds the dentist – Holliday himself - while Dodo and Steven book rooms at the hotel. There they are mocked by the Clantons, who suspect the Doctor they refer to is Holliday himself. Seth Harper is sent to the dentist's surgery and invites the Doctor, tooth removed, to the hotel in five minutes to meet his friends. Holliday is initially happy to let him be shot in his place, allowing the real Doc to disappear, but Kate intervenes to ensure the Doctor survives. This buys some time until Holliday relents and hides in an upstairs chamber of the hotel, firing his gun at appropriate moments to con the Clantons into thinking the Doctor is indeed Holliday the sharpshooter. Soon afterward Wyatt Earp and Sheriff Bat Masterson arrive and break up the fracas, taking the Doctor into custody for his own protection.
Steven now becomes embroiled in a plot to smuggle the Doctor a gun to help free him from the jailhouse, but the Doctor refuses to be armed. Steven is then confronted by a rabble wound up by the Clantons, who are intent on lynching him as an associate of Holliday. Earp and Masterson defuse the situation and take Phin Clanton into custody to ensure the co-operation of his brothers. The Doctor and Steven are freed and told to leave town as soon as possible.

Dodo has fallen in with Kate and Doc, who both plan to leave town and take her with them. When Seth Harper stumbles across their escape plans, Holliday kills him, and the trio depart. Harper's role as aide to the Clantons is soon replaced by a new arrival, Johnny Ringo, who shoots local barman Charlie by way of an introduction to the town of Tombstone. The Doctor and Steven return to the Last Chance Saloon in search of Dodo and encounter the dangerous Ringo.

Wyatt Earp's brothers Warren and Virgil have meanwhile arrived at Tombstone to help him enforce the law. The Doctor tells them that Ringo is in town. The other Clanton brothers visit the jail to free Phin, killing Warren Earp in the process.

Meanwhile, Steven heads out of town to look for Dodo with Ringo in town in search of Holliday. Steven and Kate are taken by Ringo to the Clanton ranch, where the Clantons recamp and tell their father, Pa Clanton, that they have killed an Earp. Wyatt Earp swears vengeance and starts to build a posse of lawmen to deal with the Clantons once and for all. Doc Holliday returns to Tombstone with Dodo, and offers his services to his old friend Earp too. Attempts by the Doctor to defuse the situation amount to little: there will be a gunfight at the O.K. Corral. On the one side are the three Clanton brothers and Johnny Ringo; on the other, the two Earps and Doc Holliday. At the end of the gunfight Ringo and the three Clantons are shot dead. Shortly thereafter the Doctor, Steven and Dodo slip away in the TARDIS.

They arrive on a strange planet, and decide to explore. As they leave, a strange man is seen approaching the TARDIS on the scanner.

Production
The working title for this story was The Gunslingers. This was the last serial of the classic series to have individual episode titles. From The Savages onward, each serial had an overall title divided into numbered parts or episodes. The caption at the end of "The OK Corral" reads "Next Episode: Dr. Who and the Savages".

Cast notes
Dalek voice actor David Graham played Charlie the barman. He later played Kerensky in City of Death (1979). Doc Holliday was played by Anthony Jacobs, whose son Matthew visited the set during production of the serial. Thirty years later, Matthew Jacobs wrote the script for the 1996 Doctor Who television movie.

Laurence Payne later played Morix in The Leisure Hive (1980) and Dastari in The Two Doctors (1985). Lynda Baron would later appear in the serial Enlightenment (1983), in the role of Captain Wrack, and as Val in the 2011 episode "Closing Time".

Richard Beale, who played Bat Masterson, had previously provided the voice of a disembodied Refusian in The Ark (1966).

The role of Johnny Ringo was offered to and turned down by Patrick Troughton, who would later play the Second Doctor from 1966 to 1969.

Music
This story is notable for being the first Doctor Who episode to contain musical narration, in the form of the "Ballad of the Last Chance Saloon". It was sung by Lynda Baron and written by Tristram Cary. The ballad itself is included as an extra on the CD soundtrack release. The notion of commissioning original songs for Doctor Who would resume when the series was revived in 2005, beginning with "Song for Ten" in "The Christmas Invasion".

Broadcast and reception

A common myth is that this story has the lowest ratings of any Doctor Who story. This myth likely stems from a misunderstanding of the difference between audience share and Audience Appreciation scores. The former indicates the size of the viewing audience, and the latter is based on a survey gauging the viewers' opinions of the programme. In fact the audience size for the serial ranged from 6.5 million viewers for the first episode, to 5.7 million for the last. However, the Audience Appreciation scores for the last three episodes equalled or went below the lowest scores for Doctor Who, with the very last episode, "The O.K. Corral", having a score of 30%, the lowest ever to date.

That said, the story did post ratings that were disappointing by a number of different measures. The Gunfighters represented a significant decrease over the previous serial, The Celestial Toymaker, which had ranged from 7.8 to 9.4 million viewers. Each episode of The Gunfighters was also significantly lower than for the first 18 weeks of Season 3, wherein the lowest-rated week—at 7.9 million viewers—belonged to the episode "The Feast of Steven" from The Daleks' Master Plan. Each episode of the serial was also beaten by the serials which were respectively broadcast in similar April–May slots in 1965 (The Space Museum) and in 1964 (The Keys of Marinus).

While not the lowest-rated Doctor Who story of all time, or even the lowest-rated Hartnell story, The Gunfighters did open a sustained period of significantly lower ratings for the programme that lasted almost the entirety of the remainder of the First Doctor's era. Beginning with "The O.K. Corral" — the very same episode that received the lowest Audience Appreciation figures of any Doctor Who episode — no Hartnell episode topped 6 million viewers until Episode 2 of his final story, The Tenth Planet.

Contemporary viewers were unimpressed by the story; the BBC's Audience Research Report on the final episode noted several negative reactions, including: "has deteriorated from pure science-fiction into third-rate story telling", "The story was hackneyed, ridiculous and dull", "A weak and puerile plot", and "The script, even for a children's programme, was absolute rubbish".

Reviewing the serial in 2009, Mark Braxton of Radio Times gave The Gunfighters a mixed review, explaining that it could divide opinion. While he praised the set design, he criticised "The Ballad of the Last Chance Saloon", Steven's and Dodo's costumes, and the "American" accents. Overall, he felt that the narrative could use something else, like a science fiction element or a philosophical discussion from the Doctor. DVD Talk's John Sinnott gave the serial two-and-a-half out of five stars, describing it as "decent" with "a lot going for it" but marred by Purves's overacting, the accents, and especially "The Ballad of the Last Chance Saloon". More positively, IGN reviewer Arnold T Blumburg rated the serial 7 out of 10, praising Hartnell and the production values, as well as the high energy and enthusiasm. While he also derided the ballad, he wrote that "the accents really aren't all that bad". Neela Debnath of The Independent stated that younger viewers would enjoy it as an adventure, while older audiences would appreciate the satire. Paul Cornell, Martin Day and Keith Topping described the serial as "a comic masterpiece, winning one over with its sheer charm".

Commercial releases

In print

A novelisation of this serial, written by Donald Cotton, was published by Target Books in July 1985. It is narrated in the first person by Doc Holliday (a framing scene introduces him on his deathbed) and makes a major change in the character of Johnny Ringo by depicting him as a student of the classics. An unabridged reading of the novelisation, spoken by Shane Rimmer, was released in February 2013.

Home media
The Gunfighters was released on VHS in a box-set containing the final three complete Hartnell-era serials to be released in this format (the others being The Sensorites and The Time Meddler) in November 2002. The serial was released on CD in 2007, including linking narration, the entire "Ballad of the Last Chance Saloon", and a bonus interview with Peter Purves. It was released on DVD on 20 June 2011, along with The Awakening, in a box-set titled Earth Story.

References

External links

The Whoniverse's review on The Gunfighters

Target novelisation

First Doctor serials
Science fiction Westerns
Doctor Who historical serials
Doctor Who serials novelised by Donald Cotton
1966 British television episodes
Cultural depictions of Wyatt Earp
Cultural depictions of Doc Holliday
Cultural depictions of Bat Masterson
Cultural depictions of Big Nose Kate
Cultural depictions of Johnny Ringo
Television episodes set in Arizona
Fiction set in 1881
Television episodes set in the 19th century